Zackery Farnsworth (born July 13, 2002) is an American soccer player who plays as a defender for Major League Soccer club Real Salt Lake.

Career 

He began his career playing for a local Utah team called: Sparta United SC. He won many title and was considered MVP in different in state and out state tournaments.  

Farnsworth appeared for USL Championship side Real Monarchs as an academy player on July 11, 2020, starting in a 1-0 loss to San Diego Loyal.

On June 17, 2021, Farnsworth signed as a homegrown player with Real Salt Lake.

References

External links 
 
 USSDA bio
 USL Championship bio

2002 births
Living people
Soccer players from Utah
American soccer players
Association football defenders
Real Monarchs players
USL Championship players
Real Salt Lake players
Homegrown Players (MLS)
MLS Next Pro players